Trematosaurinae is a subfamily of temnospondyl amphibians within the family Trematosauridae. Like all trematosaurids, they were marine piscivores, resembling crocodiles in their general build. Unlike the long, almost gharial-like snouts of the Lonchorhynchinae, the Trematosaurinae had more "normal" crocodile-like skulls.

Classification
Below is a cladogram from Steyer (2002) showing the phylogenetic relationships of trematosaurids:

References

External links
Mikko’s Phylogeny Archive

Triassic temnospondyls
Trematosaurines
Triassic first appearances
Triassic extinctions